Entertaining Angels is a play by Richard Everett. The production was directed by Alan Strachan and produced by Michael Codron.

Plot
As a vicar's wife, Grace has spent a lifetime on her best behaviour. Now, after the death of her husband Bardolph, she can enjoy the new-found freedom of being able to do and say exactly what she wants. But the return of her eccentric missionary sister, Ruth, together with some disturbing revelations forces Grace to confront the truth of her marriage. Set in a lush vicarage garden complete with real grass, plants and a stream with running water, the play is filled with sharp-edged comedy and probing wit with Penelope Keith giving a widely acclaimed performance as Grace.

Cast
Penelope Keith plays Grace with Benjamin Whitrow as her late husband. The rest of the cast include Polly Adams, Carolyn Backhouse and Claudia Elmhirst. It was directed by Alan Strachan and produced by Michael Codron

Reception
The play received widely positive reviews, receiving 5 stars from the Edinburgh Guide  with The Sunday Times writing that "Richard Everett has written a warm, glowing, serious comedy, like an Ayckbourn play finished by JM Barrie", while the London Evening Standard reviewed the play as a “very English comedy with some real emotion .. scratch the surface and you’ll find interesting undercurrents rippling the water .. Adultery, miscarriage, divorce and deception interestingly handled all, are just some of the problems that writer Richard Everett beds down among well-received jokes .. This is a sure-fire hit”.

References

External links
 The Official Website of Writer Richard Everett
 Indie London review of Enterttaining Angels
 Official London Theatre review of Enterttaining Angels
 Edinburgh Guide review of Enterttaining Angels

British plays